Eyralpenus inconspicua is a moth of the  family Erebidae. It was described by Rothschild in 1910. It is found in Angola, Malawi and Tanzania.

References

 Natural History Museum Lepidoptera generic names catalog

Spilosomina
Moths described in 1910